The 2010 North Greenville Crusaders football team represented North Greenville University as an independent during the 2010 NCAA Division II football season. Led by second-year head coach Jamey Chadwell, the team compiled a record of 8–3. North Greenville was invited to the Victory Bowl, where they beat . The Crusaders offense scored 408 points while the defense allowed 195 points.

Schedule

References

North Greenville
North Greenville Crusaders football seasons
North Greenville Crusaders football